Ramezan Biabani (born June 25, 1979) is an Iranian Paralympic archer. He represented Iran at the 2020 Summer Paralympics in Tokyo, Japan and won the silver medal in the Men's individual compound event.

References

External links 
 

1979 births
Living people
People from Sari, Iran
Paralympic archers of Iran
Medalists at the 2020 Summer Paralympics
Archers at the 2020 Summer Paralympics
Paralympic silver medalists for Iran
Paralympic medalists in archery
Sportspeople from Sari, Iran
Islamic Solidarity Games competitors for Iran
Islamic Solidarity Games medalists in archery
21st-century Iranian people